The 2007 FIFA Women's World Cup, the fifth edition of the FIFA Women's World Cup, was an international association football competition for women held in China from 10 to 30 September 2007. Originally, China was to host the 2003 edition, but the outbreak of SARS in that country forced that event to be moved to the United States. FIFA immediately granted the 2007 event to China, which meant that no new host nation was chosen competitively until the voting was held for the 2011 Women's World Cup.

The tournament opened with a record-breaking match in Shanghai, as Germany beat Argentina 11–0 to register the biggest win and the highest scoring match in Women's World Cup history, records which stood until 2019. The tournament ended with Germany defeating Brazil 2–0 in the final, having never surrendered a goal in the entire tournament. The Germans became the first national team in FIFA Women's World Cup history to retain their title.

The golden goal rule for extra time in knockout matches was eliminated by FIFA, although no matches went to extra time (and therefore, none required a penalty shootout).

Teams

Venues
The venues selected to host the competition were:

Squads

Match officials
FIFA's Refereeing Department selected 14 referees and 22 assistant referees from around the world to officiate the 32 games that made up the final tournament. Candidate referees for the tournament were placed under scrutiny from 2005 onwards and attended a series of training camps. Candidates refereeing standards were regularly monitored at various tournaments around the globe before a final list was prepared. This was followed by a training camp in the Canary Islands in January 2007 and a final period of preparation and training at the home of FIFA in Zurich in May. No referees were chosen from the Oceania Football Confederation at the finals. The original selection group was made up of 42 entrants, 6 of which failed fitness tests resulting in the final group of 36 being confirmed for China. The United States was the only country represented by two referees.

Unlike the men's tournaments, the quartets of match officials do not necessarily come from the same country or confederation. This selection system was explained by Sonia Denoncourt, the head of women's refereeing at FIFA's Refereeing Department, "We don't have as many referees among the women and we certainly don't want to sacrifice quality. What we are looking for above all is compatibility on the field of play and the closest possible language links in the team selected for each game. The most important thing for us is that the referees have a good performance in the match." A fourth official was chosen from those referees not officiating a game at that time.

The referees stayed together throughout the competition at their hotel base in Shanghai. From there they travelled to the various venues for their designated games, before returning to base camp to continue with their specialised training programmes. As well as fitness training, they attended regular theory sessions and reviewed previous matches to try to identify possible errors and improve their performance levels. A psychologist was also assigned to the group to help with their mental preparations ahead of games.

Draw
The group draw took place on 22 April 2007 at the Guanggu Science and Technology Exhibition Centre in Wuhan after the completion of the qualifying rounds.

FIFA automatically seeded the host and defending champions, slotting China and Germany into Group D and Group A, respectively. The FIFA Women's World Ranking for March 2007 was used to determine the teams to occupy the other seeded positions, B1 and C1. United States were ranked first, Germany second and Norway third, so the United States and Norway were also seeded.

Also, no two teams from the same confederation could draw each other, except for those from UEFA, where a maximum of two teams from UEFA could be drawn into the same group. Group B quickly became dubbed the group of death since three of the top five teams in the world were drawn in this group – the USA (1st), Sweden (3rd) and North Korea (5th), according to the June 2007 FIFA Women's World Rankings, the last to be released before the tournament. The same four teams were drawn together in Group A in the 2003 FIFA Women's World Cup, on that occasion the US and Sweden progressed to the knockout stages.

Group stage

All times are local (UTC+8).

Group A

Group B

The four teams were also paired in the same group in 2003.

Group C

Group D

Knockout stage

Bracket

Quarter-finals

Semi-finals

Third place play-off

Final

Awards

The following awards were given at the conclusion of the tournament. FIFA.com shortlisted ten goals for users to vote on as the Goal of the Tournament. The Most Entertaining Team award was also decided by a poll on FIFA.com.

All-Star Team

Statistics

Goalscorers

Assists

Tournament ranking

Coverage
Numerous TV stations around the world provided coverage of the tournament. One notable example is the Chinese-language channel CCTV-5, which also broadcast over the internet via TVUnetworks.

Monetary rewards
For the first time in FIFA Women's World Cup history, all teams received monetary bonuses according to the round they reached (all in USD):
 Champions: $1,000,000
 Runners-up: $800,000
 Third place: $650,000
 Fourth place: $550,000
 Quarter-finalists: $300,000
 First round exit: $200,000

Other rewards
UEFA used the FIFA Women's World Cup as its qualifying tournament for the 2008 Olympic women's tournament. The best three performing UEFA teams will qualify for the Olympics. Originally it was thought that, should England make the top three European teams, they would compete under the United Kingdom banner. However, on 6 September 2007, FIFA issued a press release indicating that England are ineligible to participate in the 2008 Olympics as England does not have its own Olympic Committee.
For the determination of the ranking only first through fourth place, quarterfinal elimination or group phase elimination count. If there is a need to make a distinction between teams eliminated in the quarterfinal or between teams eliminated in the group phase these teams will meet in a play-off match. In no case will the points or goals (difference) count for teams eliminated before the semi-final.

Germany and Norway qualified for the Olympics at the World Cup, whereas Denmark and Sweden had to enter a play-off for the third Olympics spot. Sweden won both legs of the playoffs with a total of 7–3 on aggregate to qualify for the Olympics.

Controversies

Kenneth Heiner-Møller and Danish players accused the Chinese hosts of harassment and covert surveillance prior to China's first round match against Denmark. China's Swedish coach Marika Domanski-Lyfors and her assistant Pia Sundhage were unaware of the incidents and Heiner-Møller absolved them of any blame, although he refused to shake hands after the match.

Notes

References

External links
FIFA Women's World Cup China 2007, FIFA.com
FIFA Technical Report
 Photos: FIFA Women's World Cup China 2007 on Time.com

 
2007 in Chinese football
FIFA Women's World Cup tournaments
International women's association football competitions hosted by China
FIFA
September 2007 sports events in Asia